"Secret Admiral-irer" is the 18th episode of the sixth season of the animated comedy series Bob's Burgers and the overall 106th episode, and was written by Holly Schlesinger and H. Jon Benjamin, and directed by Brian Loschiavo. It aired on Fox in the United States on May 22, 2016. In the episode, Tina volunteers at a nursing home to earn her next Thunder Girls badge, where her ideas of love and romance are tested. Meanwhile, Bob makes new friends who lead him into making questionable decisions.

Plot
Tina's ideas of love and romance are tested when she volunteers at a nursing home to earn her next Thunder Girls badge. Meanwhile, Bob makes new friends who lead him to make some questionable choices.

Reception
Alasdair Wilkins of The A.V. Club gave the episode a B+, he explained his rating by saying, "Still, “Secret Admiral-er” is a Tina episode, and perhaps it's because Tina's character arc has flattened now that her stories aren't quite as consistently amazing as they were a couple years ago. The main story is solid, especially since the show gives itself a relatively high degree of difficulty with how it plays Meryl's senility. There's nothing inherently wrong with playing a nonagenarian's mental state for laughs—well, I suppose you could argue there is, but I'm looking to keep my amoral, value-neutral reviewer pose going, you know?—but this is slightly harsher material than Bob's Burgers usually goes in for, and it takes a little finesse to balance the various comedic targets."

The episode received a 1.0 rating and was watched by a total of 2.23 million people.

References

External links 
 

2016 American television episodes
Bob's Burgers (season 6) episodes